Caroline Yvonne Jones (born 1 April 1955) is a  Welsh politician who was a Member of the Senedd (MS) for South Wales West from 2016 to 2021.

A former leader of the UK Independence Party (UKIP) in the Senedd, Jones served as a UKIP Senedd Member from 2016 to 2018 when she left the party to sit as an independent. In May 2019 she joined the newly formed Brexit Party group in the Senedd. She later became independent again after disagreements with the party on its newly adopted anti-devolution policy. She joined the Independent Alliance for Reform group in October 2020.

Education
She was educated at Y Pant School and Glamorgan College of Education.

Political career
Jones first stood for the Conservative Party in Aberavon at the 2010 UK general election. In 2012 Jones stood as a Conservative for South Wales Police and Crime Commissioner. Her café in Porthcawl was vandalised during the campaign and Jones pledged to donate 10% of her PCC salary to organisations dealing with victims of crime and crime prevention if elected. The perpetrators of the crime were never caught and it emerged that the CCTV camera protecting the shop was pointed the other way.

Defection to UKIP
Jones defected from the Conservatives to UKIP in 2013 and in the 2015 general election she stood for the party for the UK Parliamentary constituency of Bridgend.

Jones voted for Neil Hamilton to be the leader of UKIP in the Welsh Assembly.

After Nigel Farage declared his intention to stand down, Jones wrote a letter along with other members of the assembly urging Paul Nuttall to stand in the September 2016 UK Independence Party leadership election.

Jones is a member of the Assembly's Health, Social Care and Sport committee.

UKIP National Assembly Group Leader 

Jones replaced Hamilton as leader of UKIP in the National Assembly on the 17 May 2018 following a vote by the UKIP group.

On 10 August 2018, Jones lost the group leadership finishing last in the 2018 UKIP Wales leadership election in a three-way contest. Gareth Bennett won the contest and replaced her as group leader.

Leaves UKIP to sit as an independent
On 12 September 2018, Jones announced that she was leaving the United Kingdom Independence Party citing her reasons as the party moving "to a more far-right position" under Gerard Batten and a leadership election that was "shambolic from beginning to end". She also said that she was a victim of misogyny claiming that she was once told to "shut up" at a meeting.  UKIP Group Leader Gareth Bennett admitted that she was told this by a participant, but that "it had nothing to do with her gender". UKIP Wales Leader Neil Hamilton called on Jones to resign her regional list seat and allow another UKIP member to become an AM, which she refused to do.

Party Leader Gerard Batten described her statement as "politically correct twaddle to disguise the fact that Mrs Jones is politically ineffective..."

Joins the Brexit Party
On 15 May 2019, Jones along with three other Assembly Members joined the Brexit Party.

Leaves Brexit Party to sit as an independent
On 18 August 2020, Jones released a statement stating that she had quit the Brexit Party's Senedd Group to sit as an Independent member due to its newly adopted anti-devolution stance.  On 4 September she announced that she would stand in the 2021 Senedd election as an independent candidate for the Bridgend constituency.

In mid October 2020 she formed a new group in the Senedd, the Independent Alliance for Reform, together with fellow MSs David Rowlands and Mandy Jones. 

Jones stood as an Independent candidate for the  Bridgend  constituency seat and again stood on the South Wales West regional list, during the 2021 Senedd election; she was unsuccessful in getting re-elected to the Senedd.

Controversy
In 2004, while working as a prison officer at HM Prison Parc, Jones opened a sexual discrimination case against the prison. It was alleged that a colleague of Jones had spread rumours that she had worked as a lap dancer prior to her employment at the prison and that a campaign of intimidation was set against her to force her out. Jones subsequently lost her case.

In May 2018 it was revealed that Jones had failed to declare the employment of husband Alun Williams in her office on her register of interests. Jones described it as "an oversight" that would be corrected.

In June 2018 Jones was taken to court by former UKIP Chief of Staff Robin Hunter-Clarke for the wrongful termination of his contract. The judge ruled that she could not grant interim relief because it was unclear who Mr Hunter-Clarke's employer was at the time of the sacking. Court proceedings are set to recommence in August 2018.

References

1955 births
Living people
Alumni of the University of Glamorgan
UK Independence Party members of the Senedd
Reform UK members of the Senedd
Female members of the Senedd
Wales MSs 2016–2021
Place of birth missing (living people)
Conservative Party (UK) parliamentary candidates
UK Independence Party parliamentary candidates
Welsh women activists
Welsh feminists